Schneider may refer to:

Hospital
 Schneider Children's Medical Center of Israel

People
Schneider (surname)

Companies and organizations
 G. Schneider & Sohn, a Bavarian brewery company
 Schneider Rundfunkwerke AG, the former owner of the Dual brand of record players
 Schneider Computer Division, a brand of Amstrad CPC in association with Schneider Rundfunkwerke AG
 Schneider-Creusot, a historic French iron and steel-mill which became a major arms manufacturer; a predecessor of Schneider Electric
 Schneider Electric, a French industrial company
 Schneider Foods, a Canadian meat producer now owned by Maple Leaf Foods
 Schneider-Empain, later known as Schneider Group SA, French-Belgian industrial grouping, organised by Édouard-Jean Empain
 Schneider Kreuznach, a German manufacturer of industrial and photographic optics
 Schneider National, Inc., a provider of logistics services based in Green Bay, Wisconsin

Places
 Schneider, Indiana, a town in Lake County
 Schneider Township, Buffalo County, Nebraska

Other uses
 A common name of the fish Alburnoides bipunctatus 
 Schneider (cards), a low point score in card games like Skat or Sheepshead which boosts the opponent's game score
 Schneider (beer), an Argentinian brand of beer
 Schneider CA1, a French World War I tank
 Schneider Grunau Baby, one of a number of types of glider designed and built by Edmund Schneider of Germany and Australia
 Schneider Trophy, a prize for seaplanes

See also
 Gelfond–Schneider theorem
 Schneider-Lang theorem
 Justice Schneider (disambiguation)